Yponomeuta is a large genus of moths of the family Yponomeutidae. It has 103 described member species.

Predator Defence 
Several species have the ability to avoid predation by emitting a series of distinctive clicks as they fly. These clicks, broadcast at an amplitude that avoids attracting unnecessary attention, identify the moths as containing noxious substances and therefore discourage bats from eating them.

Species

Yponomeuta africana - Stainton, 1862 
Yponomeuta alba - Dufrane, 1960 
Yponomeuta albonigratus - Gershenzon, 1972 
Yponomeuta alienella - Walker, 1863 
Yponomeuta anatolica - Stringer, 1930 
Yponomeuta anomalella - Dufrane, 1960 
Yponomeuta athyris - Meyrick, 1928 
Yponomeuta cagnagella - (Hübner 1813)
Yponomeuta calcarata - Meyrick, 1924 
Yponomeuta calculosa - Meyrick, 
Yponomeuta catharotis - Meyrick, 1935 
Yponomeuta chalcocoma - Meyrick, 1938 
Yponomeuta cinefacta - Meyrick, 1935 
Yponomeuta conisca - Meyrick, 1914 
Yponomeuta corpuscularis - Meyrick, 1907 
Yponomeuta delicata - Schultze, 1908 
Yponomeuta diaphorus - Walsingham, 1907 
Yponomeuta disemanta - Meyrick, 1933 
Yponomeuta effeta - Meyrick, 1924 
Yponomeuta elementaris - Meyrick, 1931 
Yponomeuta enneacentra - Meyrick, 1925 
Yponomeuta euonymella - Chambers, 1872 
Yponomeuta eurinellus - Zagulyayev, 1970 
Yponomeuta eusoma - Meyrick, 1914 
Yponomeuta evonymella - Linnaeus, 1758 
Yponomeuta evonymi - Zeller, 1844 
Yponomeuta favillacea - Meyrick, 1922 
Yponomeuta fumigata - Zeller, 1852 
Yponomeuta funesta - Meyrick, 1914 
Yponomeuta gigas - Rebel, 1892 
Yponomeuta glaphyropis - Meyrick, 1908 
Yponomeuta grisea - Dufrane, 1960 
Yponomeuta griseomaculatus - Gershenzon, 1970 
Yponomeuta helicella - Freyer, 1842 
Yponomeuta hemileuca - Meyrick, 1932 
Yponomeuta hexabola - Meyrick, 1935 
Yponomeuta horologa - Meyrick, 1935 
Yponomeuta hypsicrates - Meyrick, 1925 
Yponomeuta innotata - Walsingham, 1907 
Yponomeuta internella - Walker, 1863 
Yponomeuta interruptella - Sauber, 1902 
Yponomeuta irrorella - Hübner, 1796 
Yponomeuta kanaiella - Matsumura, 1931 
Yponomeuta leucothorax - Meyrick, 1913 
Yponomeuta leucotoma - Meyrick, 1935 
Yponomeuta liberalis - Meyrick, 1913 
Yponomeuta madagascariensis - Gershenson, 2001
Yponomeuta mahalebella - Guenée, 1845 
Yponomeuta malinella (apple ermine moth) - Zeller, 1838 
Yponomeuta malivorella - Guenée, 1845 
Yponomeuta malinellus - (Zeller, 1838)
Yponomeuta martinella - Walker, 1863 
Yponomeuta mayumivorella - Matsumura, 1931 
Yponomeuta meguronis - Matsumura, 1931 
Yponomeuta melanaster - Meyrick, 1907 
Yponomeuta meracula - Bradley, 1962 
Yponomeuta meridionalis - Gershenzon, 1972 
Yponomeuta millepunctatella - Warren, 1888 
Yponomeuta minuella - Walker, 1863 
Yponomeuta mochlocrossa - Meyrick, 1935 
Yponomeuta morbillosa - Zeller, 1877 
Yponomeuta multipunctella - Clemens, 1860 
Yponomeuta munda - Meyrick, 1921 
Yponomeuta myriosema - Turner, 1898 
Yponomeuta nigricola - Meyrick, 1912 
Yponomeuta nigrifimbrata - Christoph, 1882 
Yponomeuta numerosa - Meyrick, 1921 
Yponomeuta octocentra - Meyrick, 1921 
Yponomeuta ocypora - Meyrick, 1932 
Yponomeuta orbimaculella - Chambers, 1872 
Yponomeuta orientalis - Zagulyayev, 1970 
Yponomeuta padella - (Linnaeus, 1758) 
Yponomeuta paradoxus - Gershenzon, 1979 
Yponomeuta paurodes - Meyrick, 1907 
Yponomeuta perficitellus - Walker, 1863 
Yponomeuta plumbella - Schiffermüller, 1776 
Yponomeuta polysticta - Butler, 1879 
Yponomeuta polystigmellus - Felder, 1862 
Yponomeuta praetincta - Meyrick, 
Yponomeuta puncticornis - Walsingham, 1891 
Yponomeuta pustulella - Walker, 1863 
Yponomeuta refrigerata - Meyrick, 1931 
Yponomeuta rorella - Hübner, 1796 
Yponomeuta roscidella - Hübner, 1793 
Yponomeuta sedella - Treitschke, 1833 
Yponomeuta semialba - Meyrick, 1913 
Yponomeuta shansiella - Caradja, 
Yponomeuta sistrophora - Meyrick, 1909 
Yponomeuta sociatus - Moriuti, 1972 
Yponomeuta solitariellus - Moriuti, 1977
Yponomeuta spodocrossa - Meyrick, 1935 
Yponomeuta stenodoxa - Meyrick, 1931 
Yponomeuta strigillata - Zeller, 1852 
Yponomeuta subplumbella - Walsingham, 1881 
Yponomeuta tokyonella - Matsumura, 1931 
Yponomeuta triangularis - Möschler, 1890 
Yponomeuta tyrodes - Meyrick, 1913 
Yponomeuta variabilis - Zeller, 1844 
Yponomeuta yanagawana - Matsumura, 1931 
Yponomeuta zagulajevi - Gershenzon, 1977 
Yponomeuta zebra - J.C. Sohn & C.S. Wu, 2010

Former species
 Yponomeuta atomosella Dyar, 1902  is now known as Prays atomosella (Dyar, 1902)

References

External links
 
 

Yponomeutidae